Dust and Ashes is a novel by Anatoly Rybakov that recounts the era in the Soviet Union of the build-up to the 'Congress of the Victors' (26 January - 10 February 1934), the early years of the second Five Year Plan and the (supposed) circumstances of the murder of Sergey Kirov prior to the beginning of the Great Purge, the years from 1936 to 1938. It is the third book of the trilogy, preceded by Children of the Arbat and Fear.

References

Novels by Anatoly Rybakov
1994 novels
Novels about political repression in the Soviet Union
Works originally published in Russian newspapers